Stefanos Dogos (born 5 May 1994) is a Greek footballer who plays as a winger for Naoussa.

Career
Stefanos signed his first professional contract on 27 December 2013 and made his professional debut during Veria's heavy home defeat against Olympiacos with score 5–0. Dogos was released on a free transfer on 31 August 2015.

On 10 July 2019, Stefanos joined Almopos Aridaea.

References

1994 births
Living people
Footballers from Veria
Greek footballers
Association football midfielders
Super League Greece players
Veria F.C. players
Aris Thessaloniki F.C. players
Edessaikos F.C. players